The 2019 Campbell Fighting Camels soccer team represented Campbell University during the 2019 NCAA Division I men's soccer season and the 2019 Big South Conference men's soccer season. The regular season began on August 30 and concluded on November 2. It was the program's 57th season fielding a men's varsity soccer team, and their 9th season since rejoining the Big South Conference. The 2019 season was Dustin Fonder's fifth year as head coach for the program.

Roster

Schedule 

Source:

|-
!colspan=6 style=""| Non-conference regular season
|-

|-
!colspan=6 style=""| Big South Conference regular season
|-

|-
!colspan=6 style=""| Big South Tournament
|-

|-
!colspan=6 style=""| NCAA Tournament
|-

References 

2019
Campbell Fighting Camels
Campbell Fighting Camels
Campbell Fighting Camels soccer
Campbell Fighting Camels